Bramalea Secondary School (BSS) is a high school located in Brampton, Ontario, operating under the Peel District School Board established in 1963. The school starts at 8:30 am and ends at 2:45 pm.

Honours

2006-2007 Senior Boys Rugby ROPSSAA Tier 2 Champion
2007-2008 Senior Boys Soccer ROPSSAA Tier 2 Champion
2008-2009 Junior Boys Volleyball Team Tier 2 Champion
2008-2009 Junior Boys Cricket Champion
2009-2010 Junior Boys Soccer Champion 
2009-2010 Boys Curling Silver Medalist 
2009-2010 Junior Boys Basketball ROPSSAA Tier 2 Champion 
2009-2010 Senior Boys Rugby ROPSSAA Tier 2 Champion
2010-2011 Girl Field Hockey semi finalist
2010-2011 Girl Flag Football Semi-Finalist
2010-2011 Boys Curling ROPSSAA Champion, Advanced to OFSAA
2010-2011 Senior Boys Basketball ROPSSAA Tier 2 Champion
2010-2011 Badminton: Marrio Campbell is Runner up in Senior Badminton Final tournament and Finished in Quarterfinal in OFSAA in Flight B
2010-2011 Senior Cricket Team: Tier 2 silver Medalist.

Notable alumni and faculty
Andrew Cassels, retired NHL Player
Dave Cranmer, CFL halfback
Alain Kashama, CFL and NFL defensive end
Tara Oram, country singer
Jeff Williams, author, political figure
Jasvir Rakkar, baseball player
Todd Thicke, television writer and producer
Kevin West, National Judo champion - Commonwealth Games Silver medalist
Maldwyn Cooper, 6-time national wrestling champion - Commonwealth Games Bronze medalist

See also
List of high schools in Ontario

References

External links 
 Bramalea Secondary School
 BSS Yearbook
 Bramalea Guitar Orchestra

Peel District School Board
High schools in Brampton
Educational institutions established in 1963
1963 establishments in Ontario